Sampang language  is a subgroup of Central Kiranti languages.

Geographical distribution
Sampang is spoken in the following locations of Nepal (Ethnologue).

Khotang district, Koshi Province (Khotang dialect): Tap Khola river villages, Baspani, Khartamcha, Phedi, and Patheka
Bhojpur District, Koshi Province: in Okharbote around the Lahure Khola river headwaters
Syam Khola area: Kimalung, Nigale, Talakharka, and Surke
Dingla Bazaar: a few elderly speakers use the Phali dialect in Bhojpur District, Koshi Province

Sampang language

The different branch of Sampang people
 Rana Sampang
 Samaru Sampang
 Bhalu Sampang
 Wakchalee Sampang
 Repsona Sampang
 Rangkham Sampang
 Rodu sampang
 Herang Sampang
 Maremlung Sampang
 Damrewa Sampang
 Bali Sampang
samring sampang

References

Languages of Nepal
Kiranti languages
Languages of Koshi Province